Kenyatta T. Lawson  (born January 19, 1976), better known as Ken L., is an American actor and rapper. He is best known for his role as Thaddeus "T" Tyrell Radcliffe, Jr. on the UPN comedy sitcom The Parkers.

Early life
Ken Lawson performed in many talent shows when he was a young boy. Around 1996, he began to produce and write music.

Career
Lawson's first acting role came when he portrayed Carl in the sitcom In the House. After that he was later cast in the role of "T" (Thaddeus Tyrell Radcliffe) on the UPN sitcom The Parkers, which is the spin-off series of Moesha. He had a recurring role in season 1 and then became a regular cast member for the remainder of the show, seasons 2 through 5. He appeared in 106 episodes. After The Parkers ended in 2004, he took a break from acting and then began making appearances in small roles like appearing as an African American aide in Malibu's Most Wanted, Steppin: The Movie as Mike, and a made-for-TV movie called Pimp 24/7 as Icey. Nowadays Lawson can be seen on the Bounce TV sitcom In The Cut, as a series regular since the show's inception in 2015. He reunites with his The Parkers co-star Dorien Wilson.

References

External links
 Official website
 Lawson's music
 

1976 births
Living people
American male television actors